A Petzl Croll is an ascending device used in caving and industrial rope access made by the French company Petzl. Its name comes from the town Crolles where Petzl's company headquarters are located but might also be a reference to the nearby cave system of the Dent de Crolles, the exploration of which triggered a lot of technical effort leading to innovation in caving equipment.

Usage
The Croll is normally used in the chest position and in conjunction with an upper ascender or Jumar. This configuration allows a climber, caver or rope access worker to rapidly ascend a rope.

History
In 1968 Bruno Dressler asked Fernand Petzl, who worked as a metals machinist, to build a rope-ascending tool, today known as the Petzl Croll, that he had developed by adapting the Jumar to the specificity of pit caving. Following these developments, Fernand Petzl started in the 1970s a small caving equipment manufacturing company Petzl.

Standards

 EN 567  This standard allows the Croll to be used by IRATA qualified technicians.
 EN 12841 
 CE 0197

References

Climbing equipment
Caving equipment